Ingvild Bryn (born 18 March 1961 in Voss, Hordaland) is a Norwegian journalist. She is a news anchor for the evening news Dagsrevyen, aired on the Norwegian Broadcasting Corporation.

Biography
She started as a news anchor in 1990, was then a correspondent in Washington, D.C. from 1996 to 1999 before returning to her post. She was, together with Morten Harket, the official presenter of the Eurovision Song Contest 1996.

She has education from the Volda University College and the University of Oslo. She is a proponent of Nynorsk and received the Nynorsk User of the Year award in 2012.

She hails from Voss. Her sister  is a Norwegian Broadcasting Corporation journalist. She is married to Svein Gjerdåker, and they have two adopted children.

See also
List of Eurovision Song Contest presenters

References

External links

1961 births
Living people
Norwegian television news anchors
NRK people
Norwegian television reporters and correspondents
Norwegian expatriates in the United States
Volda University College alumni
University of Oslo alumni
People from Voss